Westray Ladd (December 8, 1863 – August 15, 1909) was an American architect.

Ladd was born in Hong Kong to American parents. His family came back to Bucksport, Maine when he was one. He worked in the office of Wheelwright & Haven in Boston, Massachusetts as well as with William Emerson and Peabody & Stearns. In November, 1883 he moved to Philadelphia and ran his own office until 1902. He worked mostly on residences including homes in Overbrook, where he lived. He was a member of the American Institute of Architects and of the T-Square Club.

References

19th-century American architects
1909 deaths
1863 births
People from Bucksport, Maine
American expatriates in Hong Kong